Edward John Patty (February 11, 1924 – October 4, 2021), better known as Budge Patty, was an American world no. 1 tennis player whose career spanned a period of 15 years after World War II. He won two Grand Slam singles titles in 1950.  He was the second American male player to win the Channel Slam (winning the French Open and Wimbledon in the same year) and one of only three as of 2021.

Early life
Edward John Patty was born in Fort Smith, Arkansas, on February 11, 1924.  His grandmother was born in France, while one of his grandfathers was Austrian.  His family relocated to Los Angeles during his childhood, and he attended Los Angeles High School.  He was nicknamed "Budge" by his brother, who perceived Patty to be lethargic, resulting in a "failure to budge".

Patty started playing tennis as a child, and practised with Pauline Betz every Saturday morning when he was a junior player.  After winning the Los Angeles novice championships when he was 13, she encouraged him to take lessons with Bill Weissbuch at the Beverly Hills Tennis Club.  There, Patty was discovered by Barbara Stanwyck and Robert Taylor, who provided him with financial support to travel to national junior championships.  He triumphed at the under-15 national championships in 1939, before winning both the singles and doubles titles at the under-18 tournament two years later.  He then defended his singles title in 1942.  Patty intended to study at the University of Southern California, but was drafted into the US Army several days after registering.  He was eventually discharged in January 1946.

Career
After his return from military service, Patty partnered with Betz to win the mixed doubles title at the 1946 French Championships.  Three years later, he reached the final of the singles event, where he lost to fellow American Frank Parker.  He then won his first major singles title at the 1950 French Championships, where he won three consecutive matches in five sets, including the final against Jaroslav Drobný.  Several weeks later, he won the 1950 Wimbledon Championships in a four-set victory over Frank Sedgman.  Patty became the second American man – after Don Budge in 1938 – to win the Channel Slam.  Since then, only Tony Trabert in 1955 has achieved the feat among male players from the US.  Patty was also the fourth consecutive male player from Southern California to win Wimbledon (after Jack Kramer, Bob Falkenburg, and Ted Schroeder).  At the end of the year, Patty was ranked amateur world no. 1 in 1950 by John Olliff of The Daily Telegraph.

At the 1953 Wimbledon Championships, Patty faced Drobný again in the third round.  Patty lost the five-set match that lasted four hours and twenty minutes, despite having six match points on Drobny’s serve.  It was the longest continuous tennis match at the time.  He later recounted to The Telegraph in 2000 how he "could hardly see a thing" towards the end of that match, adding: "I was so tired I barely knew where I was".  Patty partnered with Gardnar Mulloy in 1957 to win the Wimbledon men's doubles title, upsetting top seeds Lew Hoad and Neale Fraser in the final.  Patty (aged 33) and Mulloy (aged 43) were the oldest team to win Wimbledon after World War I.  The duo also reached the final of the 1957 U.S. National Championships two months later, but lost in four sets to Fraser and Ashley Cooper.

The final tournament of Patty's career was the 1960 Wimbledon Championships, where he lost to Italy's Nicola Pietrangeli in the first round.  Patty stayed amateur throughout his career and won 46 singles titles.  These included the German International Championship in 1953 and 1954, as well as the Italian Championship in 1954.  He finished seven years ranked within the Top 10 between 1947 and 1957.  He was subsequently inducted in the International Tennis Hall of Fame in 1977.

Grand Slams finals
Source:

Singles (2 titles, 1 runner-up)

Doubles (1 title, 1 runner-up)

Mixed Doubles (1 title)

Performance timeline
Source:

Personal life
Patty moved to Paris after World War II and became fluent in French.  During the late 1950s, he was employed by a travel agency there when he was not playing competitive tennis.  He also featured in bit parts of films and worked in real estate.  He ultimately resided in Europe for over seven decades.  Patty married Maria Marcina Sfezzo in Lausanne in 1961.  They remained married until his death.  Together, they had two children: Christine and Elaine.

Patty died on October 4, 2021, at a hospital in Lausanne, Switzerland.  He was 97 years old.

Publications

References

External links

 
 
 
 

1924 births
2021 deaths
American expatriate sportspeople in Switzerland
American male tennis players
French Championships (tennis) champions
Grand Slam (tennis) champions in men's doubles
Grand Slam (tennis) champions in men's singles
Grand Slam (tennis) champions in mixed doubles
International Tennis Hall of Fame inductees
Los Angeles High School alumni
Sportspeople from Fort Smith, Arkansas
Sportspeople from Lausanne
Tennis players from Los Angeles
Tennis people from Arkansas
Wimbledon champions (pre-Open Era)
World number 1 ranked male tennis players